Scali, McCabe, Sloves was an American advertising agency founded in 1967 by Sam Scali, Ed McCabe, Marvin Sloves, Alan Pesky, and Len Hultgren.

Campaigns
The agency's ads for Perdue Farms ("It takes a tough man to make a tender chicken") made Frank Perdue a household name and were named in the top 100 ad campaigns by Advertising Age. Their ads for Volvo were named one of the top 100 campaigns of the 20th century by Advertising Age. Other campaigns were for Maxell Tape, Pioneer Electronics, and Hebrew National hot dogs.

The agency was acquired by Lowe Worldwide in 1993.

References
The Top 100 Advertising Campaigns via Advertising Age

External links
SMM Service
Reddit Marketing
C.H. Marketing Agency

Advertising agencies of the United States